The 9th annual Canadian Screen Awards were held in the week of May 17 to 20, 2021, to honour achievements in Canadian film, television, and digital media production in 2020.

Due to the ongoing impact of the COVID-19 pandemic in Canada, and the partial but incomplete progress of public vaccination, the Academy of Canadian Cinema and Television announced that the ceremony would proceed virtually, but Academy CEO Beth Janson stated that "it’s not going to be just a Zoom call of an awards show. We have a lot of exciting and creative things in store."

Most nominations were announced on March 30, 2021; however, the nominations and winners in sports broadcasting categories were announced at a later date. No new winners have been named for the Academy's annual special awards; instead, the honorees previously named in 2020, most notably Alex Trebek, were celebrated and highlighted.

In the film categories, the film Blood Quantum received the most award nominations (10), and ultimately the most wins (6), while in the television categories, Schitt's Creek also received both the most award nominations (21) and wins (8).

Changes
Due to the impact of the pandemic on theatrical film distribution in 2020, the Academy revised its eligibility rules for films. Where the rules for feature films usually require a film to receive at least one full week of theatrical screenings in at least two of Canada's major metropolitan markets, the rules for 2020 permitted films that received at least four commercial screenings in just one major market, as well as films that were commercially screened on an Academy-approved list of video on demand platforms after having been planned for conventional theatrical distribution or screened in any qualifying Canadian film festival in 2020. Short films were eligible if they received one commercial screening in Canada, were accepted into two qualifying film festivals or were distributed on an approved VOD platform; documentary films were eligible if they received three commercial screenings, have been accepted into two qualifying film festivals, or have been screened on one of the approved VOD platforms.

Janson stated that she was confident these eligibility changes would help the awards proceed normally; she also stated, however, that with the pandemic having impacted film production in 2020, the Academy was more concerned about the possibility of a downturn in qualifying content for the 10th Canadian Screen Awards in 2022. The Academy also introduced a number of new projects in 2020 to foster increased representation of diversity in the Canadian film industry, including an equity and inclusion fund to help defray the award submission fees for work by emerging content creators of colour, and new rules requiring indigenous-themed content to demonstrate direct indigenous engagement in the production, in accordance with the Indigenous Screen Office's principles of narrative sovereignty.

Other new changes at the 9th ceremony included the renaming of the Overall Sound category to Sound Mixing, and the introduction of new categories for Best Casting in films and Best Stunt Coordination.

Eligible streaming platforms
The eligible streaming platforms for the 9th Canadian Screen Awards included Amazon Prime, CBC Gem, the Cineplex Store, Club Illico, Crave, The Criterion Channel, CuriosityStream, Documentary Online Cinema, the Digital TIFF Bell Lightbox, Disney+, Dove Channel, Fandor, FlixFling, Google Play, Greetings from Isolation, GuideDoc, Highball TV, Hollywood Suite, Hoopla, Ignite TV On Demand, iTunes, Kanopy, Microsoft Films & TV, MUBI, Netflix, Pantaflix, Popcornflix, Shudder, Spuul, SundanceNow, Super Channel on Demand, Tubi, Vimeo on Demand and YouTube Premium.

Film

Television

Programs

Actors

News and information

Sports
Because many of the live sporting events on which sports broadcasting depends were cancelled in 2020, the Academy extended the eligibility period in sports broadcasting categories, and named the nominees and winners in separate events in July 2021.

Craft awards

Directing

Music

Writing

All-platform awards
One major category is currently presented without regard to the distinction between film, television or web media content.

Audience awards
Two major categories are presented based on online voting by fans through social media engagement.

Digital media

References

External links
Canadian Screen Awards

09
2020 film awards
2020 television awards
2021 in Ontario
2021 in Canadian cinema
2021 in Canadian television
2020 awards in Canada